Juan Sebastián Cabal and Robert Farah won the final 6–3, 6–3, against Luis Díaz-Barriga and Santiago González.

Seeds
The top three seeds received a bye into the quarterfinals.

Draw

Draw

External links
 Main Draw

Seguros Bolivar Open San Jose - Doubles